El colombian dream is a 2006 Colombian comedy film directed by Felipe Aljure.

References

External links 

2006 comedy films
2006 films
Colombian comedy films